Vámosmikola is a village and commune in Pest County in Hungary.

Populated places in Pest County